Andrea Balestri (born 1 September 1963) is an Italian actor and singer.

Career
He is known as the Pinocchio in 1972 serial TV The Adventures of Pinocchio, directed by Luigi Comencini, next to actors like Nino Manfredi, Franco and Ciccio, Gina Lollobrigida and the great actor and director Vittorio De Sica as the Judge.

After the great success on TV, Balestri continued he acting career working on other movies as Torino nera, directed by Carlo Lizzani, with Bud Spencer and Domenico Santoro the Lucignoloin Pinocchio, the children movie Kid il monello del West, that won the Giffoni Film Festival as the best adaptation in 1976, and Furia nera, directed by Demofilo Fidani.

During last years he took part to several TV programs to tell his cinema experience and acted in two short films. He also took part in a cameo on movie Faccia di Picasso directed by Massimo Ceccherini, in which he played "the only real Pinocchio".

He is very often guest around the schools or children festivals in which he tell his experience of "child-Pinocchio". curiosities and trivia behind the scenes, the special effects and tales regarding the various characters and the staff.

He is the author of book "Io, il Pinocchio di Comencini" 2008, introduced by Cristina Comencini, and Stefano Garavelli.

Filmography

Notes

Discography 

He recorded three songs:
 Mamma vorrei
 Chi è che ha rubato il mare, by Roberto Vecchioni
 Andrea Pinocchio, music by Fiorenzo Carpi, the author for all Comencini's Pinocchio music.

External links 

Official website di Andrea Balestri
Podcast Le Avventure di Pinocchio read by Andrea Balestri
Book Official website Io, il pinocchio di Comencini

1963 births
Living people
People from Pisa
Italian male film actors
Italian male child actors